The FIA Hill Climb Masters is an FIA-run motorsport bi-annual competition, created in 2014, with the goal of reuniting the world's top hill climb drivers in a single event  to showcase the discipline and to celebrate national and FIA champions of the year gone by.

The Masters bring together the winners of national championships, and the winners of the FIA Hill Climb Competitions. For this event, each of the drivers has to race with the same car used during the season.

There are two classifications: one Individual Classification and a Nations Cup.

FIA Hill Climb Masters Champions

See also
 European Hill Climb Championship
 FIA International Hill Climb Cup
 Hillclimbing

References

External links
  – website about Czech and European hill climbs
  – Most complete European Hill Climb Championship race results 1957–today by ing. Roman Krejčí

Hillclimbing series
Hill Climb Masters
Recurring sporting events established in 2014